Peter Graf (born 1937 in Crimmitschau) is a German painter. He won the Hans-Theo-Richter-Preis of the Sächsische Akademie der Künste in 2001.

See also
 List of German painters

References

20th-century German painters
20th-century German male artists
German male painters
21st-century German painters
21st-century German male artists
1937 births
Living people
People from Crimmitschau